Xanthophyllum adenotus var. arsatii is a plant in the family Polygalaceae. It grows as a tree or shrub.

Distribution and habitat
Xanthophyllum adenotus var. arsatii is endemic to Borneo. Its habitat is mixed dipterocarp forests from sea-level to  altitude.

References

adenotus var. arsatii
Endemic flora of Borneo
Plants described in 1932